Patric Laprade is a Canadian professional wrestling historian and French-speaking Quebecer best known for his several award winning books on Canadian and women's wrestling. and working for TVA Sports as an interviewer and was a French language broadcaster of Monday Night RAW. He is also the founder and caretaker of the Quebec Wrestling Hall of Fame and has been part of organizing women's wrestling events.

Works
Mad Dog: The Maurice Vachon Story
Mad Dogs, Midgets and Screw Jobs: The Untold Story of How Montreal Shaped the World of Wrestling
Sisterhood of the Squared Circle: The History and Rise of Women's Wrestling

See also
 James C. Melby
 List of Wrestling Observer Newsletter award winners for Best Pro Wrestling Book

References

External links
 Lutte.com

Living people
Canadian non-fiction writers in French
Historians from Quebec
Professional wrestling historians
Writers from Montreal
Canadian people of French descent
Year of birth missing (living people)